Bébert et l'omnibus or Bebert and the Train is a 1963 French film directed by Yves Robert. It is based on a novel by François Boyer.

Bebert and the Train was one of the most popular films of the year in France.

Synopsis
A young boy becomes separated from his older brother on a train and gets taken in by a local station master until his family finds him.

Cast
 Martin Lartigue (as Petit Gibus) - Bébert Martin
 Blanchette Brunoy - Mme Martin
 Pierre Mondy - Parmelin
 Jean Richard - M. Martin
 Michel Serrault - Barthoin

References

External links

1963 films
French comedy films
1960s French-language films
1960s French films